The Clio was a three-masted barque (1838-1866) built of black birch, pine and oak at Granville, Nova Scotia, (weight: 473 tons).
She was registered at St. John's, Newfoundland and Labrador on completion. For many years she crossed back and forth over the Atlantic, bringing timber from Quebec, Canada which was then sailed to Padstow, Cornwall. In Cornwall she was loaded with passengers who then sailed back to Canada. Many of these passengers were Cornish people emigrating to the United States.

History 
First, she was sold to Avery, the well-established Padstow merchant house. As a brand new deep water square rigger owned by Padstow, a full Lloyd's surveying port, trading from Padstow to Quebec City and other North American ports taking substantial numbers of emigrants and returning with prime timber for Padstow's expanding shipyards in some ways she marks the zenith of Padstow shipping. At least two diaries exist describing the transatlantic journeys 

Rawle and Easthorpe (master) took over from Avery and Brown (master) in 1845, until 185- when the problem of passing the Doom Bar persuaded them that she was too big for Padstow. She carried on as a Quebec trader, sailing from Falmouth and Plymouth and even from Gloucester. In 1865 J. Moore of Stonehouse, Devon was her owner, and her record ends with the note "Abandoned at Sea 3 July 1866".

Side information 
In April/May 1855, the Clio sailed for Quebec. Her sister ships were the John, Siam and Oriental. The Captain of Clio was William Symons, the others being Edward Rawle (John), Charles Rawle (Siam) and Henry Tom (Oriental).

The Rawles originated from Boscastle, the others from Padstow. The Rawles were a ship-owning family. Joint owners (certainly of the John) were; Thomas Ham, 10 Prospect Street, Plymouth; William Williams, draper, of Padstow; Robert Williams Avery, ship owner, 3 Charles Place, Plymouth; Philip Rawle the Younger, ship owner, 37 Gibbon Street, Plymouth; Philip Rawle the Elder of Boscastle, ship owner, 2 Gibbon Street, Plymouth; James Moore, merchant clerk of Richmond Walk, Plymouth.

The 'John' sank in 1855 after it struck the Manacles Rock, off St Keverne, on the coast of Cornwall, and more than one hundred and ninety passengers were drowned. 

An advertisement dated 11 August 1848 reads The ship "Clio", Robert EASTHOPE, Commander, now at Padstow, will leave that place for Quebec with passengers the 15th inst. Apply to: The agent for Mevagissey,  Mr. Joseph KITTO; For St. Austell, Mr. CHAPMAN, Porthpean; or at Mr. AVERY's Offices, Boscastle and Padstow.

Known sailings
The dates below were supplied, by Captain George Hogg of the National Maritime Museum Cornwall.

The dates of Clio sailings from Padstow are as follows.... 
(WB) West Briton other dates from... (BPP) British Parliamentary Papers.
 
20 March 1840 (WB)
19 June 1840 (WB)
16 April 1841 (WB)
25 June 1841 (WB)
7 August 1841
22 April 1842 (WB)
24 June 1842 (WB)
12 August 1842
1 April 1843
1 June 1843
11 August 1843 (WB)
5 April 1844 from Malpas, Truro. (WB)
23 April 1847 (WB)
3 April 1848 (see diary of Thomas Rundell)
11 August 1848 (WB)
4 April 1849 arrived Quebec May 1849
15 February 1850 (approx. from Malpas, Truro.) (WB)
?? Jun 1850 from Malpas, Truro. (WB)
15 April 1853 (Falmouth, Cardiff, Quebec) (RCG)

References

Bartlett, John (1996) Ships of North Cornwall. Padstow.

External links
 Immigrants to Canada

Water transport in Cornwall
Barques
Individual sailing vessels
Tall ships of the United Kingdom
Cornish shipwrecks
1838 ships